Pink Elephant is a Dutch brand of cigarettes, currently owned and manufactured by Heupink & Bloemen, which also creates the Black Devil brand.

History
Pink Elephant cigarettes are sold in the Netherlands, Germany, Austria, France, Spain, Switzerland, Poland, Czech Republic, and Japan The brand, like Black Devil, is a flavoured cigarette with a vanilla flavour. The cigarettes traditionally had a pink colour, but in 2012 they were rebranded to have a pink-white colour instead.

See also

 Tobacco smoking

References

Cigarette brands